Line U6 is a line on the Vienna U-Bahn.
The first section of the line opened in 1989, and was completed at its present length in 1996.
It is the only metro line in the DACH countries which is not operated by third rail but by overhead wire; this is because the centre portion of the line is an elevated part of the former Vienna Stadtbahn system, which was operated by overhead wire.

When the line was transformed to rapid transit standards, it was considered too expensive to rebuild the elevated portion for high-floor trains and third rail, as it was done with the U4. As a result, the U6 currently uses low-floor T-Class vehicles, but the U6 is not the only rapid transit line that uses low-floor metro trains, with Line M1 of the Budapest Metro being another notable example.

Stations
Line U6 currently serves the following stations:
 
 
 
 
 
  (transfer to:   -  park & ride facility)
 
 
 
 
 
 
 
 
 
 
 
 
 
 
 
 
  ( park & ride facility)
  ( park & ride facility)

References

External links
 

U6
Railway lines opened in 1989